To Feel Alive (stylized in all caps) is the second extended play by American singer Kali Uchis, released on April 24, 2020, through Virgin EMI Records and Interscope Records. It is her first extended play since Por Vida (2015) and first release overall since Isolation (2018). Unable to issue her second studio album, the singer recorded the EP's songs in her home while self-isolating due to the COVID-19 pandemic.

Background and composition 
Before the release of To Feel Alive, Uchis uploaded a video to her YouTube channel featuring snippets of demos for "Honey Baby" and "Angel", with the latter previously titled "Pablo Escobar"; ultimately, none of the songs were used for Por Vida. The two were then reworked, with "Angel" having only one line changing. Uchis first performed "I Want War (But I Need Peace)" during her 2019 co-headlining tour with Jorja Smith.

Charlie Zhang of Hypebeast wrote that the EP features "dreamy, electric synth-infused sounds that complement Uchis' uniquely wistful singing". In an interview for Insider, Uchis revealed that it took "probably 15 minutes" to write and record the EP's title track.

Artwork and promotion 
The EP's artwork consists of a drawing of a brunette Uchis performing oral sex on a blonde version of herself, representing the combining of styles found on Isolation and Por Vida, respectively, to form a new, more pleasurable one. The image's explicit content was censored on Spotify and Apple Music.

A lyric video for "I Want War (But I Need Peace)" premiered on April 26, 2020. The video's scenery was filmed in Uchis' backyard through a green screen.

Critical response 
NME Thomas Smith gave To Feel Alive a 4 out of 5 stars rating, praising Uchis' vocal performance and her decision of rerecording the demo tracks.

Track listing 

Notes
Track titles are stylized in all lowercase, except "To Feel Alive" and texts in brackets (stylized in all caps).

Credits and personnel 
Credits adapted from Tidal and organized in alphabetical order by surname.
 Rogét Chahayed – production, songwriting 
 Bunx Dadda – production 
 Jason Kirt Simeon Fleming – songwriting 
 Aja Grant – production, songwriting 
 Austen Jux-Chandler – additional production , mixing , engineering , mastering 
 Henry Lunetta – engineering 
 Prash "Engine-Earz" Mistry – mastering , mixing 
 Sounwave – production, songwriting 
 Joe Thornalley – songwriting 
 Kali Uchis – lead vocals , songwriting , production , engineering 
 Vegyn – production

Release history

Charts

References 

2020 EPs
Kali Uchis albums
Albums produced by Rogét Chahayed
Albums produced by Sounwave
Albums produced by Vegyn